Piper sanctum is a plant in the family Piperaceae, endemic to Central America.

Synonyms 
 Artanthe sancta Miq.
 Piper diandrum C.DC.
 Piper dissimulans Trel.
 Piper heterophlebium Trel.
 Piper papantlense C.DC.
 Piper venulosum Trel.

References 
 Prodr. 16(1) 330 1869.
 The Plant List
 Encyclopedia of Life
 

sanctum
Taxa named by William Trelease
Flora of Central America